Zhang Shuo may refer to:

Zhang Yue (Tang Dynasty) (663–730), may often be misread as Zhang Shuo, a Chinese official and chancellor of the Tang Dynasty
Zhang Shuo (footballer) (born 1983), Chinese football player
Zhang Shuo (gymnast) (born 1984), Chinese rhythmic gymnast